Bugdasheni Managed Reserve is a protected area in Ninotsminda Municipality in Samtskhe-Javakheti region of Georgia. It protects Bugdasheni Lake on the south-eastern part of the volcanic Javakheti Plateau, at an altitude of 2042 m above sea level.
Bugdasheni Lake ecosystem is undergoing restoration. Since 2020 it has been designated as a Ramsar site.

Bugdasheni Managed Reserve is part of Javakheti Protected Areas which also includes Javakheti National Park, Kartsakhi Managed Reserve, Sulda Managed Reserve, Khanchali Managed Reserve, Madatapa Managed Reserve.

See also
 Javakheti National Park

References 

Managed reserves of Georgia (country)
Ramsar sites in Georgia (country)
Protected areas established in 2011
Geography of Samtskhe–Javakheti
Tourist attractions in Samtskhe–Javakheti